Robert Tranberg (born 21 July 1969) is a retired Swedish football goalkeeper.

References

1969 births
Living people
Swedish footballers
Västra Frölunda IF players
Association football goalkeepers
Allsvenskan players